This is a list of transfers in Dutch football for the 2013-14 Winter transfer window. Only moves featuring an Eredivisie side are listed.

The summer transfer window will open on January 1, 2014, and will close on January 31. Deals may be signed at any given moment in the season, but the actual transfer may only take place during the transfer window. Unattached players may sign at any moment.

References

Football transfers Winter 2013-14
2013
Football transfers winter 2013–14